Evan Robert Moorhead (born 19 April 1978) is an Australian political strategist and former politician who served as a member of Queensland Parliament and subsequently as the Secretary of the Labor Party in Queensland.

Born in Redcliffe, he received a Bachelor of Arts and a Bachelor of Laws at the University of Queensland before becoming a research officer for the Australian Manufacturing Workers Union. A long-time member of the Australian Labor Party, he has been a delegate to the Young Labor State Conference and the National Conference.

On 9 September 2006, he was elected to the Legislative Assembly of Queensland as the member for the seat of Waterford, succeeding Tom Barton, the first Member for Waterford. Moorhead was re-elected on 21 March 2009, but lost his seat on 24 March 2012.

Moorhead held the position of ALP Assistant State Secretary from 2012 when former office holder Jackie Trad entered Parliament.

He became the ALP State Secretary in 2014 following the resignation of Anthony Chisholm.

References

1978 births
Living people
Members of the Queensland Legislative Assembly
Australian Labor Party members of the Parliament of Queensland
21st-century Australian politicians